Two human polls and a committee's selections comprised the 2014 National Collegiate Athletic Association (NCAA) Division I Football Bowl Subdivision (FBS) football rankings, in addition to various publications' preseason polls. Unlike most sports, college football's governing body, the NCAA, does not bestow a national championship. Various unofficial titles are bestowed by different polling agencies. Two primary weekly polls began before the season—the AP Poll and the Coaches Poll. Midway through the season, the College Football Playoff (CFP) rankings were released after the eighth week.

2014 was the first season with the new College Football Playoff system which replaced the previous Bowl Championship Series. At the conclusion of the regular season, on December 7, the final CFP rankings determined who would play in the two bowl games designated as semifinals for the first College Football Playoff National Championship on January 12, 2015, at AT&T Stadium in Arlington, Texas.

Legend

AP Poll

Coaches Poll

CFP rankings

References

Rankings
Rankings
NCAA Division I FBS football rankings